Resistencia International Airport is an airport in Chaco Province, Argentina serving the city of Resistencia. It is also known as Aeropuerto de Resistencia General José de San Martín. The airport is operated by Aeropuertos Argentina 2000.

Facilities
The airport was built in 1965, and the  passenger terminal was completed in 1971. It has a  apron that can support Boeing 777-size aircraft, and parking for 150 cars.

Airlines and destinations

Statistics

See also
Transport in Argentina
List of airports in Argentina

References

External links 
Resistencia Airport at OpenStreetMap
Resistencia Airport at Aeropuertos Argentina 2000 

Airports in Chaco Province